Albania participated at the inaugural edition of the European Games in 2015. Albania is one of eight nations that have failed to win a medal at the European Games to date.

Medal Tables

Medals by Games

See also
 Albania at the Olympics

References